The following is an extensive list of equipment currently in use by the Canadian Army and Primary Reserve. It also includes the land equipment in use by the Canadian Special Operations Forces Command, the Canadian Joint Operations Command, the Royal Canadian Navy, and the Royal Canadian Air Force.

Individual equipment

Small arms

Vehicles

Utility vehicles

Logistics vehicles

Armoured fighting vehicles
See Tanks of Canada for additional details and discussion.

Engineering vehicles and equipment

Unmanned ground systems

Unmanned aerial systems

Aircraft

All Canadian Forces aircraft, except for small unmanned aerial vehicles, fall under the command of the Royal Canadian Air Force.

Sensors

Radars

Passive sensors

Artillery

Field artillery

References

Canadian Army
Military equipment of Canada
Canadian Army
Equipment